Bijan R. Kian (Persian: بیژن کیان; born January 15, 1952), sometimes written Bijan Rafiekian (بیژن رفیعی‌کیان), is an Iranian-American businessman, who is based in San Juan Capistrano, California. He has been an executive or board member of many businesses and organizations.

Kian was a member of the Board of Directors of the Export–Import Bank of the United States from 2006 to 2011, after being nominated by President George W. Bush and receiving Senate confirmation.

Kian was a partner of retired United States Army Lieutenant General Michael Flynn in the Flynn Intel Group and worked with the incoming Trump administration's transition team on matters relating to the Office of the Director of National Intelligence.

The US Special Counsel's office opened an investigation into Flynn and the Flynn Intel Group, including Kian, in 2017.  On December 17, 2018, several months after Flynn entered into a cooperation agreement with the Special Counsel's office, and two weeks after Flynn pleaded guilty in federal court for lying to the FBI, Kian and Kamil Ekim Alptekin were indicted in US federal court. Kian was charged with illegally acting as an unregistered agent of a foreign government and for lobbying the United States on behalf of Turkey to extradite Fethullah Gülen, who lives in the U.S., to Turkey, where Gülen was blamed for orchestrating a failed coup in 2016.  Kian pleaded not guilty. The trial began on July 15, 2019. Contractors of the intel company gave testimony in the trial of the subject, which revealed the subject had requested surveillance of Gülen supporters, investigations of terrorist connections, and classified FBI documents on Gülen. Kian was found guilty and convicted on July 23, 2019. However, on September 24, 2019, Judge Anthony Trenga of the Eastern District of Virginia dismissed the indictment against Bijan Rafiekian, citing insufficient evidence. The U.S. 4th Circuit Court of Appeals reinstated the conviction on March 18, 2021.

See also
Judge throws out guilty verdict against Michael Flynn's lobbying partner Bijan Kian
Mueller Report
Timeline of investigations into Trump and Russia (2019)
Timeline of the presidency of Donald Trump

References 

21st-century American businesspeople
American people of Iranian descent
Living people
Trump administration personnel
1952 births
Businesspeople from Tehran
People from San Juan Capistrano, California